At least two warships of Japan have borne the name Izumo:

 , an  launched in 1899 and scrapped in 1946
 , a helicopter carrier launched in 2013 

Japanese Navy ship names